Simon Aspelin and Paul Hanley were the defending champions; however, Aspelin decided not to participate.
As a result, Hanley partnered up with Lukáš Dlouhý. They were eliminated by Sergiy Stakhovsky and Mikhail Youzhny in the quarterfinals.
Stakhovsky and Youzhny won this tournament, by defeating Jérémy Chardy and Feliciano López 4–6, 6–3, [10–3] in the final.

Seeds

  Mahesh Bhupathi /  Leander Paes (quarterfinals)
  Mariusz Fyrstenberg /  Marcin Matkowski (first round)
  Michaël Llodra /  Nenad Zimonjić (semifinals)
  Lukáš Dlouhý /  Paul Hanley (quarterfinals)

Draw

Draw

External links
 Main Draw

Dubai Tennis Championships - Doubles
2011 Dubai Tennis Championships